Carlee Taylor (born 15 February 1989) is an Australian racing cyclist, who currently rides for UCI Women's Continental Team . She took up cycling in 2007 after previously competing in triathlon.

See also
 2014 Orica-AIS season

References

External links

1989 births
Living people
Australian female cyclists
Cyclists from Adelaide